Chaudhry Akbar Ibrahim officially known as Muhammad Akbar Chaudhry is the Minister for Rehabilitation State Disaster Management Authority (SDMA) and Civil Defence. He became  member of Azad Jammu and Kashmir Legislative Assembly for the third time . He contested the AJK 2021 Elections as a joint candidate of Pakistan Tehreek-e-Insaf & Pakistan Muslim League (Q). He won the seat with 14264 votes. He previously served as the Minister of Tourism, Wildlife & Environment in Azad Kashmir. He was born at Tanda District Gujrat of Punjab Pakistan.

References

Living people
Year of birth missing (living people)